Walther Sallaberger (born 3 April 1963 in Innsbruck) is an Austrian Assyriologist.

From 1982 to 1988, Walther Sallaberger studied languages and cultures of the ancient Near East as well as classical archeology at the University of Innsbruck. He learned Hittite, Old Persian, Turkish and Hebrew in addition to the common languages of the disciplines. From 1982 to 1989 he took part in prehistoric excavations in Austria, in Eski Mosul and Borsippa in Iraq, in Velia in Italy and in Pergamon in Turkey.

Sallaberger has been a professor of assyriology at the University of Munich since September 1999. From 2005 to 2007 he was director of the Department of Cultural Studies and Classical Studies at the University of Munich, from 2007 to 2009 Dean of the Faculty of Cultural Studies.

Guest lectureships have taken him to the University of Bern (1992/93), the University of Venice (2001), the University of Oxford (2002), the Venice International University (2004) and the University of Verona (2007). In 2012 the Bavarian Academy of Sciences chose him as a full member.

Some works

External links

References 

1963 births
Austrian Assyriologists
Academic staff of the Ludwig Maximilian University of Munich
Academic staff of Leipzig University
Members of the Bavarian Academy of Sciences
Living people
Assyriologists